The Second Brazauskas Cabinet was the 13th cabinet of Lithuania since 1990. It consisted of the Prime Minister and 13 government ministers.

History 
Algirdas Brazauskas, the leader of the Social Democratic Party of Lithuania had led the 12th government as the Prime Minister since 2001. The outgoing government coalition "Working for Lithuania" finished second in the elections in October 2004, behind the populist Labour Party, but Brazauskas was again appointed the Prime Minister by President Valdas Adamkus on 29 November 2004. The 13th cabinet received its mandate and started its work on 14 December 2004, after the Seimas gave assent to its program.

The government collapsed in late spring of 2006, when in April New Union (Social Liberals) left the coalition and in May President Adamkus expressed no-confidence in Minister of Culture Vladimiras Prudnikovas and Minister of Health Žilvinas Padaiga, who were delegated by the Labour Party. This criticism caused the Labour Party's council to withdraw its ministers from the government, prompting Brazauskas to resign on 1 June 2006. By the first week of May, the government became minority one as 9 members of Labor Party parliamentary group (including Speaker of Seimas Viktoras Muntianas) formed their own parliamentary group, which was called Civic Democratic parliamentary group. The government continued to serve in an acting capacity, with Zigmantas Balčytis as the acting Prime Minister until the Kirkilas Cabinet started its work on 18 July 2006.

Cabinet
The following ministers served on the Second Brazauskas Cabinet.

References 

Cabinet of Lithuania
2004 establishments in Lithuania
2006 disestablishments in Lithuania
Cabinets established in 2004
Cabinets disestablished in 2006

lt:Sąrašas:Lietuvos ministrų kabinetai (nuo 1990)#Tryliktoji Vyriausybė